Alwal station is located in the heart of Alwal, Secunderabad. The station is just besides the Rythu Bazaar, which is a major vegetable shopping area of Alwal.

This station serves the railway station for Alwal, Old Alwal, Venkatapuram, Army Sub Area, Suchitra, and few more areas nearby. This is one of the major stations between Secunderabad and Medchal station.

This part of the town is very well connected with Secunderabad which is 8 km away. TSRTC connects various part of Alwal, Venkatapuram and Old-Alwal through various bus routes. One of the prominent places in Alwal include a four way crossing in Venkatapuram, which includes a church, temple and a mosque, which signifies how diverse this place is. The people also are welcoming and are seen celebrating all festivals with the same vigor and enthusiasm.

Been surrounded by the South India headquarters of the Indian Armed Forces also makes Alwal a very peaceful and calm zone with very little disturbances. Festivals like Bonalu, Dussehra, Christmas, Eid and Vinayaka Chaturthi are celebrated on a very grand scale. The two large water bodies in Alwal and Old-Alwal adds more serenity to the localities and the people of Alwal.

Lines
Hyderabad Multi-Modal Transport System
Secunderabad–Bolarum route (SB Line)

Image gallery

External links

MMTS Timings as per South Central Railway

MMTS stations in Ranga Reddy district
Hyderabad railway division